Frederick William Harmer (18 July 1884 – 7 March 1919) was a British track and field athlete who competed in the 1908 Summer Olympics. In 1908 he was eliminated in the semi-finals of the 400 metre hurdles competition. He was born in West Ham and died in Shenfield. His brother, Henry Harmer, was also a British Olympian.

References

External links
Frederick Harmer's profile at the British Olympic Committee

1884 births
1919 deaths
People from West Ham
Athletes from London
English male hurdlers
Olympic athletes of Great Britain
Athletes (track and field) at the 1908 Summer Olympics
Deaths from the Spanish flu pandemic in England